The FINA World Championships or World Aquatics Championships are the World Championships for aquatics sports: swimming, diving, high diving, open water swimming, artistic swimming, and water polo. They are run by World Aquatics, and all swimming events are contested in a long course (50-metre) pool.

The event was first held in 1973 in Belgrade, Yugoslavia, and is now held every two years. From 1978 to 1998, the World Championships were held every four years, in the even years between Summer Olympic years. From 2001 until 2019, the Championships have been held every two years, in the odd years.

Due to the effects of the Covid-19 pandemic, the scheduling of both the Olympic Games and the Championships between 2019 and 2025 became somewhat erratic, with World Championships not taking place in Japan in 2021 to accommodate the delayed 2020 Summer Olympics, and then delayed again to 2023 because of pandemic-related issues in Japan. As a result, an extraordinary edition of the event was announced for 2022 in Budapest, Hungary, so as not to leave a four year gap between World Championships. As a result, World Championships will be held in four consecutive years for the first time – 2022 in Budapest,Hungary, 2023 in Fukuoka, Japan (the original 2021 event hosts, delayed thrice), 2024 in Qatar (moved to 2024 from the original 2023 event, then moved again to January to accommodate the 2024 Summer Olympics), and 2025 in a place to be announced. This will also mean there will be six global championships in the space of four years (mid 2021 - to mid 2025). The circle resumes with Budapest hosting the event again in 2027.

Athletes from all 209 FINA members could take part in the competition. In 2019, records were set for the most countries participating, with 192 members, and the most athletes participating, with 2,623 athletes.

Championships

* Record by number of gold medals –  (23 gold medals, 1978)
** Record by number of total medals –  (49 medals in total, 2022)

All-time medal table
Updated after the 2022 World Aquatics Championships.

Multiple gold medalists

Boldface denotes active athletes and highest medal count per type.

Disciplines
Except as noted below, there are male and female categories for each event.

Swimming

Diving

Men's and women's events:
 1 m springboard
 3 m springboard
 10 m platform
 synchronized 3 m springboard
 synchronized 10 m platform

Mixed events added at the 2015 World Aquatics Championships:
 synchronized 3 m springboard
 synchronized 10 m platform
 3 m springboard / 10 m platform team

High diving

 27m (men only)
 20m (women only)
High diving included since the 15th FINA World Aquatics Championships in 2013 in Barcelona but was dropped at the   2022 championship due the lack of suitable venues.

Open water swimming

 5 km
 10 km
 25 km
 Mixed Team

Open water swimming was first held at the 1991 FINA World Championships.

Synchronized swimming

Except for Free Combination and Highlight, all events include technical and free routines, with medals awarded separately.
 Solo
 Duet, including mixed pair (male-female) since the 16th FINA World Aquatics Championships in 2015 in Kazan
 Team
 Free combination
 Highlight since 2019 FINA World Championships in Gwangju

Water polo

Men's tournament
Women's tournament

See also
 List of World Aquatics Championships medalists in swimming (men)
 List of World Aquatics Championships medalists in swimming (women)
 Major achievements in swimming by nation
 FINA World Swimming Championships (25 m)
 FINA World Junior Swimming Championships
 FINA Swimming World Cup
 FINA World Masters Championships
 FINA Marathon Swim World Series

Notes and references

External links
 FINA official web site
 results Swim Rankings 

 
Biennial sporting events
Recurring sporting events established in 1973
Aquatics